Italy–Yemen relations refers to the current and historical relationship between Italy and Yemen. Yemen has an embassy in Rome. Italy has an embassy in Sana'a.

History

Diplomatic relations between Italy and Yemen began on September 2, 1926, when the Italo-Yemeni Treaty was signed. This treaty granted Italy, then ruled by Benito Mussolini, control over the east coast of the Red Sea.

See also  
 Foreign relations of Italy
 Foreign relations of Yemen 
 Yemen–European Union relations

 
Yemen
Bilateral relations of Yemen